Lawrence Reginald Smith, SM, MMM, SAStC,  is a General Officer in the South African Army. General Smith completed the South African Army Command and Staff  Duties Course at the South African Army College, Pretoria over the period January 1994 until November 1995. Smith graduated from the US Army Command and General Staff  College in Leavenworth, Kansas, in 1997 and the People's Liberation Army of China, National Defense College, Beijing, in 2008.

Military career 
General Smith was appointed to the post of Deputy Chief of the South African Army on 1 January 2015, taking over from Maj Gen Les Rudman.

Smith completed National Service in 1976. He served on the South West African/Namibian border and commanded Sector 5 in the Democratic Republic of Congo (DRC) in 2003 and 2004.

He has also been the designated SADC Standby Force Military Component Commander and was in charge of it during Exercise Golfinho in 2009. He was also Head of the African Union Standby Force during its final Combat Readiness Exercise (Amani Africa) in November 2010. More recently he was involved in the preparation of the ACIRC (African Capacity for Immediate Response to Crises) Force within the SANDF as well as at African Union level as the Deputy Exercise Director of Exercise UTULIVU AFRICA 2014.

Prior to being named DEPUTY CHIEF of the South African Army, Smith was General Officer Commanding 43 South African Brigade headquarters.

Honours and awards 

 
 
 
 
  (Mentioned in Dispatches)
 
 
 
 
 
   AMANI AFRICA 
  MONUC

References 

South African Army generals
South African military officers
Living people
Year of birth missing (living people)